Liberal Alliance may refer to:

Liberal Alliance (Chile), a historical political party in Chile
Liberal Alliance (Denmark), a political party in Denmark, formerly known as New Alliance
Liberal Alliance (Greece), a political party in Greece
Liberal Alliance of Montenegro, a former political party in Montenegro
Nicaraguan Liberal Alliance, a political party in Nicaragua

See also
Alliance of Liberals and Democrats for Europe, a political grouping in the European Parliament
SDP-Liberal Alliance, a former electoral alliance in the United Kingdom
Alliance Party of Northern Ireland, a liberal political party in Northern Ireland
GSLP–Liberal Alliance, a political alliance in Gibraltar